The women's heptathlon at the 2012 World Junior Championships in Athletics was held at the Estadi Olímpic Lluís Companys on 12 and 13 July.

Medalists

Records
, the existing world junior and championship records were as follows.

Results

100 metres hurdles

High jump

Shot put

200 metres

Long jump

Javelin throw

800 metres

Final standings

Participation
According to an unofficial count, 30 athletes from 22 countries participated in the event.

References

External links
 WJC12 Heptathlon schedule

Heptathlon
Combined events at the World Athletics U20 Championships
2012 in women's athletics